185 empty chairs, also known as 185 white chairs or 185 empty white chairs or simply as 185 chairs, is an unofficial memorial for the 185 individuals who died in the 2011 Christchurch earthquake. Envisaged as a short-term installation made from chairs painted white, it has become a major tourist attraction in Christchurch, New Zealand. Installed at the day of the earthquake's first anniversary, it preceded the official earthquake memorial—the Canterbury Earthquake National Memorial—by five years. As of 2017, there is a desire to turn the temporary installation into a permanent fixture.

History
Christchurch was struck by an earthquake on 22 February 2011 that killed 185 people. On the day of the earthquake's first memorial, local artist Peter Majendie arranged 185 empty chairs that he had painted white on the site of the demolished Oxford Terrace Baptist Church. The day after the installation, the local newspaper The Press reported that the artist's intention was for the memorial to stay for a week. The artist himself said later that he thought the chairs should stay for three weeks.

Majendie's main inspiration for the installation came from paintings by Vincent van Gogh of empty chairs, representing their owners' different personalities. When he created his artwork, Majendie was aware of the Field of Empty Chairs as part of the Oklahoma City National Memorial, and the chairs in New York's Bryant Park.

In October 2012, the installation moved a few hundred metres south to the site of the demolished St Paul's Church, as building activity was to start at the Baptist Church site. This second site is diagonally opposite the CTV Building site where 115 people died.

When the winning design for the Canterbury Earthquake National Memorial was announced in May 2015, Majendie started considering the future of his temporary installation. He pondered the idea of having the chairs made into a permanent fixture. In January 2017, Majendie firmed up on the idea and proposed to turn the temporary installation into a permanent one by casting chairs in aluminium and having them powder-coated white. It was also necessary to find a new site, as the St Paul's Church site was designated by the government for the proposed Christchurch Stadium. Majendie favoured the CTV site for the installation. The placement at the CTV site was rejected by some of the relatives of the victims. 

The official earthquake memorial was unveiled on 22 February 2017, six years after the earthquake causing the 185 deaths, and five years after Majendie installed his installation.

Reception
The American travel website TripAdvisor lists 185 empty chairs as the city's top landmark attraction (ahead of the Christchurch Gondola and the Cardboard Cathedral), and puts it in fourth place across New Zealand.

References

Monuments and memorials in New Zealand
Christchurch Central City
Outdoor sculptures in Christchurch
Cultural infrastructure completed in 2012
2011 Christchurch earthquake